is a Japanese footballer who plays for Kagoshima United FC.

Club statistics
Updated to 23 February 2018.

References

External links

Profile at Kagoshima United FC

1993 births
Living people
Toyo University alumni
Association football people from Mie Prefecture
Japanese footballers
J3 League players
Japan Football League players
Kagoshima United FC players
Suzuka Point Getters players
Azul Claro Numazu players
Association football forwards